Wind Fell is a hill in the Ettrick Hills range, part of the Southern Uplands of Scotland. The Dumfries and Galloway-Scottish Borders border lies across the hill. Close to the Southern Upland Way, routes of ascent frequently incorporate its track and it is almost always climbed along with the neighbouring hills.

Subsidiary SMC Summits

References

Mountains and hills of Dumfries and Galloway
Mountains and hills of the Scottish Borders
Donald mountains